Praecereus saxicola is a  flowering plant in the family Cactaceae that is found in Bolivia, Argentina and Paraguay

Description
Praecereus saxicola grows shrubby with sparsely to well branched, upright to spreading, bluegreen stems of 1.5 to 3 centimeters in diameter. There are 6 to 9 ribs available. The 1 to needle-like middle spines are up to 1.5 inches long. The 6 to 9 needles are white and have a black tip. They are 2 to 6 millimeters long.

The greenish-white flowers are up to 12 centimeters long. The fruits have diameters of up to 3 centimeters.

References

External links
 
 

saxicola
Flora of Bolivia
Flora of Paraguay